Lukavica may refer to:

Bosnia and Herzegovina
 Lukavica (Bosnia and Herzegovina), a municipality of  Istočno Sarajevo
 Lukavica, Čelić, a village in Bosnia and Herzegovina
 Lukavica (Istočno Novo Sarajevo), a town in Bosnia and Herzegovina
 Lukavica (Gračanica), a village in Bosnia and Herzegovina

Serbia
 Lukavica (Dimitrovgrad), a village in Serbia
 Lukavica (Lazarevac), a village in Serbia
 Lukavica (Tutin), a village in Serbia

Slovakia
 Lukavica, Bardejov District, a municipality in Slovakia
 Lukavica, Zvolen District, a municipality in Slovakia

See also 
 Lukavec (disambiguation)
 Lukavice (disambiguation)